The city of Lancaster is the county seat of Lancaster County, South Carolina, United States, located in the Charlotte Metropolitan Area. As of the United States Census of 2010, the city population was 8,526. The city was named after the famous House of Lancaster.

History 

The following are listed on the National Register of Historic Places:

 Robert Barnwell Allison House
 Craig House
 Cureton House
 Thomas Walker Huey House
 Lancaster Cotton Oil Company
 Lancaster County Courthouse
 Lancaster County Jail
 Lancaster Downtown Historic District
 Lancaster Presbyterian Church
 Mount Carmel A.M.E. Zion Campground
 North Carolina-South Carolina Cornerstone
 Perry-McIlwain-McDow House
 Leroy Springs House
 Wade-Beckham House
 Waxhaw Presbyterian Church Cemetery

Geography
Lancaster is located at  (34.721100, -80.773315).

Demographics

2020 census

As of the 2020 United States census, there were 8,460 people, 3,469 households, and 2,064 families residing in the city.

2010 census
As of the census of 2010, there were 10,160 people, 5,396 households, and 3,115 families residing in the city. The population density was 1,406.2 people per square mile (543.4/km2). There were 3,778 housing units at an average density of 649.7 per square mile (251.1/km2). The racial makeup of the city was 49.49% African American, 47.54% White, 0.12% Native American, 0.88% Asian, 0.04% Pacific Islander, 1.15% from other races, and 0.78% from two or more races. Hispanic or Latino of any race were 2.25% of the population.

There were 3,396 households, out of which 27.3% had children under the age of 18 living with them, 35.5% were married couples living together, 22.6% had a female householder with no husband present, and 37.7% were non-families. 33.1% of all households were made up of individuals, and 15.2% had someone living alone who was 65 years of age or older. The average household size was 2.37 and the average family size was 3.01.

In the city, the population was spread out, with 25.8% under the age of 18, 8.9% from 18 to 24, 26.8% from 25 to 44, 21.8% from 45 to 64, and 16.6% who were 65 years of age or older. The median age was 37 years. For every 100 females, there were 83.1 males. For every 100 females age 18 and over, there were 77.1 males.

The median income for a household in the city was $28,650, and the median income for a family was $33,380. Males had a median income of $27,090 versus $22,382 for females. The per capita income for the city was $16,828. About 18.0% of families and 23.0% of the population were below the poverty line, including 33.2% of those under age 18 and 17.8% of those age 65 or over.

Education
Lancaster is home to the Lancaster County School District, SC which has around 11 elementary schools, 5 middle schools, and 4 high schools. In 2008 South Carolina Governor Mark Sanford named Andrew Jackson Middle School, located in nearby Kershaw, as the recipient of the state's Best Special Education School Award. The City is also home to the University of South Carolina at Lancaster, also known as USCL.

Public Schools Located in Lancaster:

Lancaster High School
Andrew Jackson High School
Andrew Jackson Middle School
A.R. Rucker Middle School
Buford Elementary School
Buford Middle School
Buford High School
Erwin Elementary School
South Middle School
North Elementary School
McDonald Green Elementary School
Brooklyn Springs Elementary School
Clinton Elementary School
Discovery Elementary School
Southside Pre-School

Private Schools:
Carolina Christian Academy

Universities:
USC Lancaster

Library:
Lancaster has a public library which is the main building of the Lancaster County Library System. Additional branches are located in Indian Land and Kershaw.

Notable people

 Tom Addison, former professional football player and team captain of the Boston Patriots, 1960-1968
 Cathy Smith Bowers, poet and professor; North Carolina Poet Laureate, 2010–2012
 Danny Clyburn, baseball player
 Don Dixon, musician and producer
 Charles Duke, NASA astronaut who walked on the moon during the Apollo 16 mission
 Hattie N. Harrison, Maryland legislator and educator
 Jim Hodges, former governor of South Carolina
 Andrew Jackson, seventh president of the United States (disputed birthplace/childhood home with Waxhaw, North Carolina)
 Nina Mae McKinney, one of the early African-American film stars in the United States and one of the early African Americans to appear on British television
 Julie Roberts, country music singer
 Aaron Robinson, professional baseball player with the Yankees, 1943-1951
 J. Marion Sims, controversial founder of gynecology; the J. Marion Sims Foundation is located in Lancaster
 Elliot White Springs, World War I flying ace
 Sindarius Thornwell, professional basketball player who last played for the NBA's Los Angeles Clippers 
 Maurice Williams, singer

References

External links
 
 Lancaster Police Department

Cities in South Carolina
Cities in Lancaster County, South Carolina
County seats in South Carolina
1830 establishments in South Carolina
Populated places established in 1830